The Buckeye Institute is a 501(c)(3) free-market public policy think tank. The organization, based in Columbus, Ohio, says its mission is "to advance free-market public policy in the states."

The Buckeye Institute largest funders include the Koch Family, the Searle family and Donors Capital Fund. While the Buckeye Institute claims to be non-partisan, some members of its staff have an affiliation with the Republican Party.

History and leadership
In 1989, economist Sam Staley founded the Urban Policy Research Institute (UPRI) in Dayton, Ohio. In 1994, UPRI was reorganized into the Buckeye Institute. The organization's original researchers were centered at Wright State University. In 1999, The Buckeye Institute moved from Dayton to Columbus, Ohio.

Columbus Mayor Greg Lashutka was a former chair of the organization's board of directors. Matt Mayer, who went on to found Opportunity Ohio, led the organization from 2009 through 2011. Robert Alt, The Buckeye Institute's current president, assumed that role in October 2012.

Organizational structure
The Buckeye Institute has several research fellows and scholars responsible for conducting the group's research into various public policy debates, including health care, education, and economic development. The Buckeye Institute started a legal advocacy group, the 1851 Center for Constitutional Law, which was eventually spun off on its own.

Policy issues
The Buckeye Institute has eight focus areas: accountable government, budget and taxes, education, energy and environment, federalism, health care, labor, and legal. In each of those issue areas, Buckeye staff produce peer-reviewed policy reports, provide expert testimony to Ohio's state legislature and the United States Congress, and submit amicus briefs to state and federal courts, including the Supreme Court of the United States.

As part of its accountable government priority area, the Buckeye Institute also has searchable salary databases, using publicly available information, for local, state, K-12, and higher education public employees. The organization has called its salary databases “the key to transparency” for government. Ohio Treasurer Josh Mandel mirrored the Buckeye Institute's efforts on his own transparency website.

Taxes and spending
The Buckeye Institute has supported a reduction in the Ohio state income tax. The Buckeye Institute has twice published "The Piglet Book", an account of government spending that it deems wasteful. 

In 2006, the organization supported a proposed constitutional amendment that would have placed annual limits on the growth of tax revenue and government spending, similar to other states' Taxpayer Bills of Rights.

Education
The Institute produces reports and research that promote a market-based approach to education, including vouchers and charter schools. 

In 2008, the Buckeye Institute launched a database which includes publicly available information about the salaries of Ohio public school teachers.

References

External links

 The Buckeye Institute
 EDIRC listing (provided by RePEc)
 Organizational Profile – National Center for Charitable Statistics (Urban Institute)

Political
Government watchdog groups in the United States
Legal advocacy organizations in the United States
Political and economic think tanks in the United States
Non-profit organizations based in Ohio
Think tanks established in 1994
Conservative organizations in the United States